Jhuk Gaya Aasman ( The Skies Have Bowed) is a 1968 romantic comedy film directed by Lekh Tandon. It stars Rajendra Kumar, Saira Banu, Rajendranath and Prem Chopra. The music is by Shankar Jaikishan. The film is a remake of the American film Here Comes Mr. Jordan (1941). The film was commercially unsuccessful on its initial release, but has since garnered appreciation from both critics and audience. The rights to this film are owned by Shah Rukh Khan's Red Chillies Entertainment.

Summary

Sanjay (Rajendra Kumar) is in love with Priya (Saira Banu). They are painting rosy dreams of their life as husband and wife, until Priya learns that her father has been arrested. The duo decide that they will get married after Priya is able to bail out her father. Sanjay is happy, but destiny has other plans: Sanjay dies in a car crash. But after he is escorted by Yamdoot and handed over to Pradhan Sanchalak, Head co-ordinator of Death department (David) to heaven, he learns that his death was a mistake.

The angel makes arrangements to send Sanjay back to earth, but his body has already been cremated. Then, the angel takes him to the house of Tarun Kumar, Sanjay's lookalike, who should have been originally killed instead of Sanjay. Tarun has been murdered just seconds before by his own brother (Prem Chopra). Sanjay learns that Tarun is a criminal and his brother wants to usurp his money. Now, it is up to Sanjay and his guardian to turn the tides and make up the loss.

Plot

Sanjay is a poor man making his living as a tourist guide in Darjeeling. He meets Priya Khanna, who has come from Calcutta. The duo fall in love. Everything is hunky dory for them, until Priya receives the news of her father's arrest. The duo decide to put their dreams on the hold until Priya's father is exonerated. Priya leaves, while Sanjay returns, hopeful and joyous. However, he dies in a car accident and is escorted by Hindu deity of death, Yamaraj for the retribution of his sins.

It is revealed that Sanjay was never supposed to die. Yamaraj learns that he mistakenly killed Sanjay instead of his look alike, Tarun Kumar. As punishment, Yamaraj is tasked with sending Sanjay back to Earth. On Earth, Sanjay's body has already been cremated. Realizing that now Sanjay's soul has to be put in somebody else's body, Yamaraj takes him to Tarun's home. Unknown to them, Tarun has been shot in the back by his own brother mere seconds ago. Yamaraj retrieves the bullet and tells Sanjay to occupy Tarun's body.

Priya succeeds in bailing out her father and learns from him that he was framed by Tarun. Meanwhile, Sanjay learns that Tarun was a criminal and correctly deduces that he was killed for his money. Tarun's errant ways have dissociated him from his grandmother, his only living relative. Sanjay decides to right Tarun's wrongs. Tarun's brother is shocked to see him alive, but Sanjay feigns ignorance. Tarun's secretary Rita is working for his brother secretly. Here, Priya comes back to exact revenge on Tarun, but is obviously stunned to see him.

Sanjay is saddened by the turn of events. He succeeds in convincing his friend (Rajendra Nath) about his true identity. Later, he slowly starts shutting Tarun's illegitimate businesses and diverts the money to charity instead. This sudden change stuns and surprises Tarun's grandmother, while his brother is angered at losing money to this newfound philanthropy. Sanjay starts courting Priya again. Seeing that Tarun has reformed, everybody gives him their blessing to his marriage with Priya. However, Rita drops a bombshell that she is married to Tarun.

Sanjay is unable to prove or disprove anything, making matters worse for him again. However, Rita is acting as a mere pawn in the hands of Tarun's brother. He decides to confront Rita to know the truth, but Tarun's brother has already anticipated it. He kills Rita and Priya is framed for the murder. Sanjay succeeds in running away and confronting Tarun's brother. Tarun's brother finally confesses all his crimes in front of Sanjay, which is also heard by Sanjay's buddy. Just as Sanjay is going to be killed by Tarun's brother, the angel knocks him out.

In the end, Tarun's brother is arrested on the basis of his testimony. Realizing that Sanjay will now be able to live the life in form of Tarun, the very life that was unjustly taken from him, the angel unites him with Priya and returns to his heavenly abode.

Cast
 Rajendra Kumar as Sanjay Kumar Refugee / Tarun Kumar "Battu" "Pappu" Saxena aka T.K. (double role)
 Saira Banu as Priya Khanna
 Rajendra Nath as Hanuman Singh
 Prem Chopra as Prem Kumar Saxena, Tarun's evil brother 
 Durga Khote as Mrs. Saxena, Tarun's grandmother
 Parveen Choudhary as Rita Saxena, Tarun's wife
 Hari Shivdasani as B.K.
 Gajanan Jagirdar as Shankarlal Khanna, Priya's father
 Brahm Bhardwaj as Devilal
 Krishan Dhawan as Ramdas
 Ram Avtar as Motumal
 David Abraham Cheulkar as Yamaraj, Hindu deity of death
 Ratan Gaurang as Gaurang
 Randhir as Hanuman's maternal uncle
 Madhumati as Priya's hostel friend
 Ruby Mayer as Girl's hostel superintendent
 Meena T. as Priya's hostel friend

Soundtrack
The song "Kaun Hai Jo Sapnon Mein Aaya" was a copy of Elvis Presley's "Marguerita" from the film Fun in Acapulco. The song "Kisi Ki Jaan Lete Hain" was sampled for beginning of Black Eye Peas's song My Humps.

References

External links
 

1968 films
Indian remakes of American films
1960s Hindi-language films
Films directed by Lekh Tandon
Films scored by Shankar–Jaikishan